
Gmina Wojaszówka is a rural gmina (administrative district) in Krosno County, Subcarpathian Voivodeship, in south-eastern Poland.

The gmina contains part of the protected area called Czarnorzeki-Strzyżów Landscape Park.

Villages
Gmina Wojaszówka contains the villages and settlements of Bajdy, Bratkówka, Łączki Jagiellońskie, Łęki Strzyżowskie, Odrzykoń, Pietrusza Wola, Przybówka, Rzepnik, Ustrobna, Wojaszówka and Wojkówka.

Neighbouring gminas
Gmina Wojaszówka is bordered by the city of Krosno and by the gminas of Frysztak, Jasło, Jedlicze, Korczyna, Strzyżów and Wiśniowa.

References
Polish official population figures 2006

Wojaszowka
Krosno County